Burra (Old Norse: Barrey ) is the collective name for two of the Shetland Islands, West (pop. 753) and East Burra (pop. 66), which are connected by bridge to one another, and  to the Shetland Mainland via Trondra.

In addition, Burra was an ancient Civil parish that included smaller additional islands such as South Havra, Little Havra, Papa and the tidal island  West Head of Papa. The civil parish of Burra was merged into the civil parish of Lerwick, along with Quarff and Gulberwick, in 1891. It continues to exist as Quoad sacra parish of the Church of Scotland.

Collins Encyclopedia of Scotland suggests that the name is a corruption of "Borgarey" (island of the broch), and while this is unlikely, and no broch is extant, the place name Brough, on West Burra  lends some support to this case. However, the form used in the Orkneyinga saga is "Barrey".

References

Islands of Shetland
Scalloway Islands